The British Transplant Society (BTS) awards the Medawar Medal each year for the best clinical and scientific research presentations by a scientist or doctor. The Medawar medal is the most prestigious award that the society can offer, is highly competitive, and cannot be won more than once by a single individual. The award is named after Peter Medawar, a Nobel Prize winner in Medicine or Physiology. Two medals are awarded every year.

See also

 List of medicine awards

References

British science and technology awards
Medicine awards

External links
BTS Medawar Medal